St. Albans Main Street Historic District is a national historic district located at St. Albans, Kanawha County, West Virginia.  The district includes 22 contributing buildings in the central business district of St. Albans. They were constructed following two fires in 1906 that destroyed the original frame structures. Notable buildings include the Ivanhoe Lodge No. 71 (c. 1910), Hamrick Hospital / Braley Thompson Learning Center (c. 1940), Alban Theater (c. 1937), Old First National Bank & Post Office (c. 1910), First Baptist Church (1907, 1922, 1938), and the Washington Lodge No. 58 (c. 1926), designed by Walter F. Martens.  Located in the district and separately listed is the Bank of St. Albans Building is 

It was listed on the National Register of Historic Places in 2000.

References

Neoclassical architecture in West Virginia
Colonial Revival architecture in West Virginia
Historic districts in Kanawha County, West Virginia
National Register of Historic Places in Kanawha County, West Virginia
Historic districts on the National Register of Historic Places in West Virginia
St. Albans, West Virginia